Abdullatif Al-Sayed Bafaqih is a Southern Yemeni warlord from Abyan who played a major role during the wars against Al-Qaeda after 2012 in Abyan Governorate.

Previously, he joined AQAP for a short period of time in 2011 before defecting from the group the same year and joined the forces of Yemen's internationally recognized President Abdrabbuh Mansur Hadi. Al-Sayed is part of the Southern Movement secessionist movement.

War against Al Qaeda
When Al-Qaeda came to Zinjibar in early 2011, Sayed joined AQAP, as he was close to an AQAP commander in Abyan, named Abu Ali al-Hadrami. During the Battle of Zinjibar, he defected from AQAP, and his militia joined president Hadi's forces. He came in direct confrontation with al-Hadrami, as he was surrounded in his home village from Al-Hadrami's forces. Later, when the government launched the 2012 Abyan offensive, he battled his former commander, Abu Hamza al-Zinjibari, AQAP's Emir of Abyan, after a planned meeting gone wrong. During that period, he formed the Popular Committees, numbering about 7,000 fighters, which was backed from Hadi. At that point, he was the de facto ruler of Abyan, as all the Hadi loyal police and soldiers in the province, were under his command.

After 2012 war with AQAP
After the 2012 war, he survived multiple assassination attempts by AQAP, losing more than 50 family members to the group, and one eye and partially a hand during these attempts. At some point in after 2012, he was ranked a Brigadier General. In 2015, he was ousted by AQAP during the Fall of Zinjibar and Jaar, and fled to Aden. AQAP put an arrest warrant for him offering seven million Yemeni rials on his head. During the Abyan conflict, his forces were largely ingrained to the Al-Hizam, a force backed by United Arab Emirates and the Southern Transitional Council. In April 2017, he resigned from his post as commander of Zinjibar and Khanfar, and took command of the Hizam's Rapid Deployment Force.

References

External links

Living people
People of the Yemeni Revolution
Yemeni politicians
Yemeni generals
Yemeni Sunni Muslims
People from Abyan Governorate
Year of birth missing (living people)